Deborah Jane Mailman  (born 14 July 1972) is an Australian television and film actress, and singer. Mailman is known for her characters: Kelly Lewis on the Australian drama series The Secret Life of Us, Cherie Butterfield in the Australian comedy-drama series Offspring, Lorraine in the Australian drama series Redfern Now and Aunt Linda in the Australian dystopian science fiction series Cleverman. Mailman is currently portraying the lead role of Alexandra "Alex" Irving on the Australian political drama series Total Control.

Mailman was the first Aboriginal actress to win the Australian Film Institute Award for Best Actress in a Leading Role, and has gone on to win four more both in television and film. She first gained recognition in the 1998 film Radiance for which she won her first AFI award. Her other well known films are Rabbit-Proof Fence, Bran Nue Dae, Oddball, The Sapphires, Paper Planes, Blinky Bill the Movie, Combat Wombat, H Is for Happiness, and The Book of Revelation.

Personal life
Deborah Jane Mailman was born and grew up in Mount Isa in north-west Queensland. She is one of five children. She has both Aboriginal (Bidjara) and Māori (Ngāti Porou and Te Arawa) heritage. In 1992, she graduated from Queensland University of Technology Academy of the Arts with a Bachelor of Arts majoring in performing arts. She is married with two children.

Career

Mailman played the role of Kate in a La Boite Theatre production of Shakespeare's The Taming of the Shrew in 1994. Other early stage roles include solo show The Seven Stages of Grieving (which she co-wrote with Wesley Enoch) for Kooemba Jdarra, Queensland Theatre Company's 1997 revival of Louis Nowra's play Radiance, and Cordelia in King Lear for Bell Shakespeare in 1998.

In 1998, Mailman made her film debut as Nona in the Australian independent film Radiance (based on the play), for which she won the AFI Award for Best Actress in a Leading Role. She had a role in The Secret Life of Us, for which she was twice awarded Most Outstanding Actress in a Drama Series at the Logies (2002 and 2004).

Mailman was part of the Leah Purcell documentary Black Chicks Talking (2001), where she discussed her Aboriginal heritage. In 2006, she took part in a four-part television documentary series with Cathy Freeman called Going Bush, where the pair set off on a journey from Broome to Arnhem Land spending time with Indigenous communities along the way.

She appeared in the Play School TV series and was part of The Actors Company for the Sydney Theatre Company (2006–2007). She was a presenter on the ABC Television show Message Stick.

She appeared in the film Rabbit-Proof Fence. She played a lead role in the 2010 musical film Bran Nue Dae. In the play The Sapphires and the subsequent film of the same name she played the role of singer Gail McCrae.

She was awarded an Inside Film Award for her short film Ralph, which starred Madeleine Madden. From 2010 to 2014, she played the role of Cherie Butterfield in Channel Ten's Offspring drama series.

In 2012, she starred in Redfern Now, an indigenous mini-series for the ABC.

On 29 January 2015, Mailman co-hosted the AACTA Awards with Cate Blanchett.

Mailman started as Maureen Prescott in Paper Planes, released 15 January 2015. She then appeared as Mayor Lake in Oddball and the voice of Blinky Bill's mother in Blinky Bill the Movie.

On 18 February 2015, Mailman joined the Sydney Opera House Trust.

In 2019, Mailman was appointed to a three-year term as a member of the Screen Australia Board.

In 2019, she starred as politician Alex Irving in the series Total Control, produced by Blackfella Films and screened on the ABC.

Filmography

Films

Television

Awards and nominations

AACTA Awards

Equity Ensemble Awards

FCCA Awards

Helpmann Awards

Logie Awards

Other awards
In 2003, Mailman was NAIDOC Person of the Year, and also won Female Actor of the Year.

In 2012, Mailman was a recipient of the Queensland Greats Awards.

In 2017, Mailman won the Chauvel Award, which acknowledges significant contribution to the Australian screen industry.

References

External links
 

Living people
1972 births
20th-century Australian actresses
21st-century Australian actresses
Actresses from Queensland
Australian children's television presenters
Australian film actresses
Australian people of Māori descent
Australian stage actresses
Australian television actresses
Australian women television presenters
Best Actress AACTA Award winners
Best Supporting Actress AACTA Award winners
Bidjara (Warrego River)
Helpmann Award winners
Indigenous Australian actresses
Logie Award winners
Members of the Order of Australia
Ngāti Porou people
People from Mount Isa
Queensland University of Technology alumni
Queensland Greats
Te Arawa people
Blinky Bill